Gary Keller may refer to:
Gary Keller (basketball), American basketball player
Gary Keller (saxophonist), American jazz and classical saxophonist
Gary W. Keller, realtor and author